Khanewal–Wazirabad Branch Line is one of several branch lines in Pakistan, operated and maintained by Pakistan Railways. The line begins from Khanewal Junction station and ends at Wazirabad Junction station. There are 40 railway stations from Khanewal Junction to Wazirabad Junction. The line is important in that it connects Faisalabad with other parts of the country by rail.

The Khanewal–Wazirabad Branch Line was originally named the Wazirabad–Multan Railway under the North Western State Railway. A survey for a railway line began in 1892. The Wazirabad–Lyallpur began construction in 1894 and opened in 1896. The Lyallpur–Multan section began construction the following year and opened in 1899.

Stations
The railway stations on this railway line are:

References

5 ft 6 in gauge railways in Pakistan
Railway lines opened in 1896
Railway stations on Khanewal–Wazirabad Line